A Wear was an Irish chain of women's clothing stores with a wide number of operations in the Republic of Ireland and Northern Ireland. The brand also operated internationally through its online store at awear.com and stores within the United Kingdom. It ceased trading in January 2014.

Ownership
 The brand A Wear first started out as 'Gaywear'. The first store opened in Limerick in 1966. The store expanded nationwide in 1973 when Galen Weston's retail empire invested in the company. In 1985, it was rebranded as A Wear. Up until 2007, the stores were owned by the Brown Thomas Group.
In May 2007, a consortium led by Alchemy Partners purchased the company for €70 million from the Brown Thomas Group. In late 2011, due to the continued economic downturn and high-retail rents in the Republic of Ireland, Alchemy Partners announced it was to go into receivership.
On 17 October 2011, Hilco Groups's Hilco Capital Ireland Ltd purchased the company and its debt. On 15 February 2012, Hilco placed A Wear into receivership. 
On 16 February 2012 it was confirmed that A Wear operations in the Republic of Ireland and Northern Ireland were purchased out of receivership. An international consortium headed by Michael Flacks of Flacks Group bought the company and will continue to operate the 32 stores in Ireland with possible expansion.

In 2013, A Wear re-entered the UK retail market after going into receivership in December 2011; it currently operates its clothing range from 10 House of Fraser stores in the UK only and will open its own stand-alone stores in autumn-winter 2013. The new look UK stores will showcase the new look A-wear branding and stores which will be rolled out in the Republic of Ireland also in autumn.

In October 2013, A Wear confirmed that its parent company went into examinership. After failing to exit examinership successfully on Thursday 28 November 2014, all A Wear stores in the Republic of Ireland ceased operation after the appointment of Kavanagh Fennell as receiver by Chelsey Investissement SA. Its concession stores in the United Kingdom also ceased operations. 300 jobs are at risk. The appointed receiver noted that some stores would remain closed with the possibility of retaining more profitable stores, with the aim to sell these stores to a suitable buyer. Its loss making online store (awear.com) has also ceased trading at that time.

On 28 November 2013 the company entered receivership. By early December a number of stores in Dublin and Sligo were reopened. As of the week beginning December 9 the following stores have reopened:

Blanchardstown 
Castlebar 
Limerick (Crescent SC) 
Galway
Grafton Street
Dundrum
Liffey Valley
Sligo
Swords

All other stores remain closed. Its Cork flagship store on Patrick's Street, which was one of its biggest stores, its store in Mahon Point, and its online stores are not scheduled to reopen.

The remaining stores closed during the period from 24 December 2013 to 11 January 2014 when the final store shut its doors.

Clothing range
Previous fashion designers who have designed for A Wear include John Rocha, Quin and Donnelly, Marc O'Neill and Peter O'Brien. Prior to 2000, A Wear stores in Ireland also had a range of men's clothing.

Stores

Former stores
Blanchardstown 
Castlebar 
Limerick (Crescent SC) 
Galway
Grafton Street
Dundrum
Dún Laoghaire
Liffey Valley
Sligo
Letterkenny
Swords
Tallaght, The Square

Previous stores

Republic of Ireland
Carlow
Cork
Dublin
Limerick
Galway
Kildare
Offaly
Navan
Kerry
Tipperary
Waterford
Wexford

Northern Ireland
Antrim
Down
Armagh

United Kingdom
In administration since 22 December 2011, in administration again in October 2013
Glasgow (Scotland)
Bristol (England)
Leicestershire (England)
Staffordshire (England)
Swansea (Wales)

References

External links
Official website

Clothing companies of Ireland